Nathaniel Dourif Friedman is an American technology executive and investor. He was the chief executive officer (CEO) of GitHub, and former Chairman of the GNOME Foundation. Friedman is currently a board member at the Arc Institute, and an advisor of Midjourney.

Life and career

Friedman attended and graduated from St. Anne's-Belfield School in 1996.

In 1996 while a freshman at Massachusetts Institute of Technology, Friedman befriended Miguel de Icaza on LinuxNet, the IRC network that Friedman had created to discuss Linux.  As an intern at Microsoft Friedman worked on the IIS web server.  At MIT he studied Computer Science and Mathematics and graduated with a Bachelor of Science in 1999.

Friedman co-founded Ximian (originally called International Gnome Support, then Helix Code) with de Icaza to develop applications and infrastructure for GNOME, the project de Icaza had started with the aim of producing a free software desktop environment.  The company was later bought by Novell in 2003.

At Novell, Friedman was the Chief Technology and Strategy Officer for Open Source until January 2010.  There he launched the Hula Project which began with the release of components of Novell NetMail as open source.  During his tenure, Novell began an effort to migrate 6,000 employees away from Microsoft Windows to SUSE Linux and from Microsoft Office to OpenOffice.org. Friedman's final project before his departure was work on SUSE Studio.

During his sabbatical, Friedman created and hosted a podcast called Hacker Medley with friend and former Ximian employee Alex Graveley.

In May 2011, Friedman and de Icaza founded Xamarin, with Friedman as CEO.  The company was created to offer commercial support for Mono, a project that de Icaza had initiated at Ximian to provide a free software implementation of Microsoft's .NET software stack.  At Xamarin they focused on continuing to develop Mono and MonoDevelop and marketing the cross-platform Xamarin SDK to developers targeting mobile computing devices and video game consoles. In 2016, Xamarin was acquired by Microsoft.

With the June 2018 announcement of Microsoft's $7.5 billion acquisition of GitHub, the companies simultaneously announced that Friedman would become GitHub's new CEO. GitHub's co-founder and then-current CEO Chris Wanstrath had been leading a search for his replacement since August 2017. Friedman assumed the role of CEO on the 29th of October 2018. During his tenure as CEO, Friedman introduced a number of new products rapidly, including GitHub Copilot, GitHub Codespaces, a native GitHub mobile app for iOS and Android, GitHub Actions, the GitHub Advanced Security product, GitHub Sponsors to support open source developers financially, and a new GitHub CLI. Friedman also acquired six companies including NPM, Semmle, Dependabot, and PullPanda. He helped grow Github to an estimated value of $16.5 billion, more than double what Microsoft paid for GitHub in 2018. On 3 November 2021, Friedman announced that he was stepping down as CEO.

Friedman co-founded California YIMBY in 2017 to address California’s housing shortage.

He has been married to Stephanie Friedman (née Schatz) since 2009.

References

External links

 

American male bloggers
American bloggers
American computer programmers
21st-century American businesspeople
GNOME developers
Living people
GitHub people
Year of birth missing (living people)